Wolfgang Musculus, born "Müslin" or "Mauslein", (10 September 1497 – 30 August 1563) was a Reformed theologian of the Reformation.

Life

Born in the village of Duss (Moselle), in a German-speaking area (French-speaking, from the Thirty Years War), Musculus was a lover of song and of knowledge, of languages, Humanism and religion. The oral tradition of his songs is still found in the churches of the Reformation.

In 1527, he left the Benedictine monastery at Lixheim (now in the area of Moselle), to serve as deacon of the Cathedral of Our Lady of Strasbourg and preaching assistant to Matthäus Zell while studying under Bucer and Capito. He left for Augsburg in 1531, and after 17 years of service, he left the town after the introduction of the Augsburg Interim, and came to Switzerland, where he was the primary professor of theology at Bern from 1549. At Bern, he wrote several biblical commentaries and Loci communes sacrae theologiae (Common Places of the Christian Religion), a major systematic theology.

J. S. Bach used Musculus' 1530 hymn, a paraphrase of Psalm 23, as the text for his chorale cantata Der Herr ist mein getreuer Hirt, BWV 112, which he first performed in Leipzig in 1731.

Notes and references

Bibliography

. The Validity of Children at the Lord's Table in the Words of an Early Reformed Theologian.
 Includes appendices on oaths and usury.
.

External links
 

1497 births
1563 deaths
People from Dieuze
German Calvinist and Reformed theologians
Swiss Calvinist and Reformed theologians
16th-century Swiss writers
16th-century Calvinist and Reformed theologians
German male non-fiction writers
16th-century German Roman Catholic priests
German Protestant clergy
German Christian monks
German Protestant hymnwriters
Academic staff of the University of Bern